Rajeh Mustafa Mahmoud was a Syrian Major general who was commander of the military engineering unit of the Republican Guard (Syria). Mahmoud was born on 15 January 1959 in Homs. He is from Umm al-Dawali village in Homs Governatore.

The Republican Guard of Syria is used to protect top Syrian government officials from any external threats. As one of the Guard's commanders Major General Mahmoud served as an official ceremonial guard of president Bashar al-Assad.

On 1 February 2012 State media reported that he and three of his soldiers were killed in a clash around Damascus on 1 February 2012. State media claimed "a number" of combatants were also killed.

Major general Rajeh Mahmoud as a ceremonial guard to president Bashar al-Assad.

References

2012 deaths
Brigadier generals
Syrian generals
Syrian military personnel killed in action
Military personnel killed in the Syrian civil war
1959 births